Euglena gracilis is a freshwater species of single-celled alga in the genus Euglena. It has secondary chloroplasts, and is a mixotroph able to feed by photosynthesis or phagocytosis. It has a highly flexible cell surface, allowing it to change shape from a thin cell up to 100 µm long, to a sphere of approximately 20 µm. Each cell has two flagella, only one of which emerges from the flagellar pocket (reservoir) in the anterior of the cell, and can move by swimming, or by so-called "euglenoid" movement across surfaces. E. gracilis has been used extensively in the laboratory as a model organism, particularly for studying cell biology and biochemistry.

Taxonomy

A morphological and molecular study of the Euglenozoa put E. gracilis in close kinship with the species Khawkinea quartana, with Peranema trichophorum basal to both, although a later molecular analysis showed that E. gracilis was, in fact, more closely related to Astasia longa than to certain other species recognized as Euglena. The transcriptome of E. gracilis was recently sequenced, providing information about all of the genes that the organism is actively using. They found that E. gracilis has a whole host of new, unclassified genes which can make complex carbohydrates and natural products.

References

External link

Euglenozoa